In Denmark you find a number of military museums showing exhibitions on military subjects and providing information on Danish or international military history. These museums may be state funded or private foundations.

These military museums may cover one or more services of the Military of Denmark, which comprises:
 The Army
 the Air Force
 The Navy
 The Home Guard

The following museums show exhibitions on the Army:
 The Royal Danish Arsenal Museum in Copenhagen
 Aalborg Defence and Garrison Museum
 Dybbøl Banke Museum and History Centre, Southern Jutland
 Forsvarsmuseet at Bornholm http://formus.dk/
 The Artillery Museum at Varde

Exhibitions on the Air Force are found at:
 Denmark's Air Force Museum at Stauning
 Aalborg Defence and Garrison Museum

The following museums show exhibitions on the navy:
 Royal Danish Naval Museum
 Aalborg Søfarts- og Marinemuseum

Exhibitions on the Home Guard are found at:
 Home Guard Museum at Frøslev
 Aalborg Defence and Garrison Museum

An exhibition with an international emphasis is:
 Sea War Museum Jutland

References

 Visit Denmark: Attractions in Denmark

Military and war museums in Denmark